Chad Edward Moeller [MOE-ler] (born February 18, 1975) is an American former professional baseball catcher. He played in Major League Baseball (MLB) from 2000 through 2010 for the Minnesota Twins, Arizona Diamondbacks, Milwaukee Brewers, Cincinnati Reds, Los Angeles Dodgers, New York Yankees, and Baltimore Orioles.

College career
Moeller attended the University of Southern California (USC) and played college baseball for the USC Trojans baseball team. In 1995, he played collegiate summer baseball with the Orleans Cardinals of the Cape Cod Baseball League and was named a league all-star. In 1996, he was an All-Pac-10 Conference selection. He was drafted in the seventh round (187th overall) of the 1996 Major League Baseball Draft by the Minnesota Twins.

Professional career
Moeller played with the Minnesota Twins (2000), Arizona Diamondbacks (2001–2003), Milwaukee Brewers (2004–2006), Cincinnati Reds (2007), and Los Angeles Dodgers (2007).

In four seasons with Minnesota and Arizona, Moeller batted .254 with 11 home runs, 56 RBI, 31 doubles, 4 triples, and two stolen bases in 188 games. He also got his first World Series ring when the Diamondbacks defeated the Yankees in the 2001 World Series.

When he was with the Brewers, Moeller was used increasingly only for calling games with staff ace Ben Sheets. He did however hit for the cycle on April 27, 2004. He was the first Brewer to hit for the cycle at home, and the first since Paul Molitor did it on May 15, 1991 at Minnesota.

2006–07 seasons
In January 2006, Moeller was named to Team USA's provisional roster for the 2006 World Baseball Classic.

Just prior to the 2006 All-Star break, Moeller was designated for assignment by the Brewers, primarily due to his low batting average (.184). After clearing waivers he joined the Triple-A Nashville Sounds. On July 15, 2006, he caught a combined no-hitter with the Sounds' Carlos Villanueva, Mike Meyers, and Alec Zumwalt. Moeller began the 2007 season with the Cincinnati Reds. After splitting time between Cincinnati and the Triple-A Louisville Bats, he was traded to the Los Angeles Dodgers for cash considerations on August 11, 2007.

2008 season
On November 27, 2007, Moeller signed a Minor League contract with an invitation to spring training with the Washington Nationals. He was released by the Nationals on March 10, 2008, and signed a minor league contract with the New York Yankees the same day. The Yankees purchased his contract on April 14 following injuries to Jorge Posada and José Molina. On April 25, 2008, he was designated for assignment because it had been thought that Posada would be able to play through his injury. Posada, however, was placed on the 15-day disabled list on April 28, and the Yankees added Moeller back to the active roster upon clearing assignment waivers on April 30. He remained on the active roster following Posada's return from the disabled list, but was again designated for assignment on July 31 following the acquisition of Iván Rodríguez. He cleared waivers and returned to Triple-A Scranton. While with the Yankees, Moeller played third and first base twice each, the first time in his career he played a position other than catcher. Moeller rejoined the Yankees on September 1, when the rosters expanded from 25 to 40. Moeller became a free agent after the season.

2009 season

Moeller signed a minor league contract with the Baltimore Orioles on December 12, 2008, and made its Opening Day roster as a backup catcher. After batting .200 with a .259 on-base percentage in fifteen games, he was designated for assignment on May 29 when the Orioles promoted top catching prospect Matt Wieters from the Triple-A Norfolk Tides. Moeller cleared waivers five days later and was assigned to the Tides. Moeller was recalled to Baltimore on August 7 when the Orioles traded catcher Gregg Zaun to the Tampa Bay Rays.

2010 season
Moeller was signed to a minor league contract which included an invitation to spring training with the Baltimore Orioles on December 4, 2009. He was granted his release on April 1 after not making the team.
On April 3, Moeller signed a minor league contract with the New York Yankees. On May 20, he was called up to the Major League roster to back up Francisco Cervelli after another injury to Posada. He played his first game of the season on May 29, starting against the Cleveland Indians. On June 21, Moeller was designated for assignment to clear room on the roster for outfielder Colin Curtis, returning to the Scranton Wilkes-Barre Yankees on June 26. He was called up again on September 1.

Personal life
Moeller is a cousin of MLB players Chris Cron, C. J. Cron, and Kevin Cron.

Moeller now teaches, coaches, instructs, has camps, and does video analysis of catching and hitting instruction for youth baseball.

See also
 List of Major League Baseball players to hit for the cycle

References

External links

Official website

Major League Baseball catchers
Minnesota Twins players
Arizona Diamondbacks players
Milwaukee Brewers players
Cincinnati Reds players
Los Angeles Dodgers players
New York Yankees players
Baltimore Orioles players
USC Trojans baseball players
Orleans Firebirds players
Baseball players from California
People from Upland, California
Elizabethton Twins players
Fort Wayne Wizards players
Fort Myers Miracle players
New Britain Rock Cats players
Salt Lake Buzz players
Tucson Sidewinders players
Nashville Sounds players
Louisville Bats players
Las Vegas 51s players
Scranton/Wilkes-Barre Yankees players
1975 births
Living people